Alangudi is a municipality in the Pudukkottai district of the Indian state of Tamil Nadu, that serves as the headquarters for Alangudi taluk, one of the 11 taluks in Pudukkottai district. The town has been ruled, at different times, by the Cholas, Mutharaiyars, Early Pandyas, Thondaimans, and the British. Tamil Nadu's first women Asiad Santhi Soundarajan is from Alangudi municipality.

Geography
It has an average elevation of 79 metres (259 feet).

Demographics
 India census, Alangudi had a population of 10,742. Males constituted 51% of the population and females 49%. Alangudi had an average literacy rate of 77%, higher than the national average of 59.5%; with 55% of the males and 45% of females literate. chettiaar people lives in most of these area.

Politics
The Alangudi (State Assembly Constituency) is part of the Sivaganga (Lok Sabha constituency).

The current Environment and Climate Change minister  and member of legislative assembly for Alangudi is V.Meyyanathan.

References

Cities and towns in Pudukkottai district